is a kendo tournament held every year in Japan. The men's tournament is held at Nippon Budokan on 3 November, on Culture Day.

For Kendoka - not only Japanese -, the event is considered as the most prestigious in this sport, even more prestigious than the World Kendo Championship.

Overview 
The All Japan Kendo Championship is a tournament, in which the best male Kendoka in Japan will be decided through a sudden death system. A total of 64 kendoka participate in the championship. To win the title, the competitor needs to win all of his six bouts. The competitors are not only required to show strength, but also courtesy in accordance with the martial arts spirit.
The winner receives the Emperor's Cup.

Qualification 
The qualification are conducted on prefectural level. Each prefectural Kendo Federation of the All Japan Kendo Federation is responsible for their own qualification. The winner of each qualification tournament will be qualified for the All Japan Kendo Championship. However, in Hokkaido, Ibaraki, Kanagawa, Shizuoka, Aichi and Hyōgo the runner up of also qualifiers, while in Chiba, Tokyo, Osaka, Saitama, Fukuoka both runner up and the third placed Kendoka are qualified for the tournament.
Until the 32nd tournament in 1984, only 6th dan kendoka were allowed to qualify, before the restrictions were lowered to 5th dan at the 38th tournament in 1990. Since the 43rd tournament in 1995, there are no restrictions in age and rank.

Winners

Statistics

Most wins 
6 times：Masahiro Miyazaki (1990, 1991, 1993, 1996, 1998 and 1999)
3 times：Masashi Chiba (1966, 1969 and 1972)/ Kiyonori Nishikawa (1987, 1989 and 1994)/ Ryoichi Uchimura (2006, 2009 and 2013)/ Hidehisa Nishimura (2015, 2017 and 2018)
2 times：Taro Nakamura (1955, 1959) / Tadao Toda (1962, 1964)/ Tetsuo Kawazoe (1971, 1975)/ Toshiya Ishida (1992, 1995)/ Susumu Takanabe (2010, 2011)

Most consecutive wins 
2 consecutive times：Masahiro Miyazaki (1990–1991, 1998–1999) / Susumu Takanabe (2010–2011)/ Hidehisa Nishimura (2017–2018)

Competitor's professions 
Police officers provide by far the vast majority of the competitors, followed by teachers. The competitors, who participated in the early years of the tournament were from various professions, but the police force emerged from around 1965 and began to compete with the teachers for the championship in the 1950s. From then on police officers dominate the championships and Japanese kendo at professional level. They are Kendo personnel selected as part of the tokuren, a special unit of the riot police dedicated for doing professional kendo as a profession. The largest tokuren squads fully dedicated to kendo are the Tokyo Metropolitan Police and the prefectural police departments of Osaka, Kanagawa and Hokkaido. Kendo police officers in smaller prefectural police departments may also conduct regular police work in the riot squad more often than in the latter mentioned departments due to shortage.
Teachers also provide a large group among the competitors. Most of them either teach physical education at high school level or kendo.
A third significant group at the championships are students. They either qualify via the All Japan University Kendo Championship or through the prefectural qualifying. Two of the youngest winners of the championship were students with Yuya Takenouchi (now kendo police officer in the Tokyo Metropolitan Police) being the first student to win the championship in after 43 years.

Number of championships by prefecture 
16：Tokyo  (10 people)
13：Kanagawa (6 people)
7：Osaka (6 people)
5：Aichi  (5 people) / Kumamoto (3 people)

Youngest Champions 
 21 years 5 months：Yuya Takenouchi（2014・62nd）

Oldest Champion 
45 years：Shohei Yamazaki（1968・16th）

See also 
World Kendo Championship
European Kendo Championships

External links 
全日本剣道選手権大会

National championships in Japan
Kendo